Justin David Gentle (born 6 June 1974) is an English former footballer who played as a forward in the Football League for Colchester United.

Career

Born in Enfield, London, Gentle played for non-league Boreham Wood before joining Luton Town. He failed to make the first-team at Luton, and moved to Colchester United. He made his Football League debut on 30 April 1994, coming on as a substitute for Tony Cook in a 3–1 home win over Doncaster Rovers. His final professional game was to come in the following game, coming on as a substitute for player-manager  Roy McDonough who was also playing in his final game for the club. The away match at Carlisle United ended in a 2–0 defeat for the U's.

After leaving Colchester, Gentle played for Chesham United, Enfield, St Albans City, Dagenham & Redbridge and Billericay Town.

References

External links
St Albans City profile at SACFC
Profile at Non League Daily

1974 births
Living people
Footballers from Enfield, London
English footballers
Association football forwards
Boreham Wood F.C. players
Luton Town F.C. players
Colchester United F.C. players
Chesham United F.C. players
Enfield F.C. players
St Albans City F.C. players
Dagenham & Redbridge F.C. players
Billericay Town F.C. players
Harlow Town F.C. players
English Football League players